is a Japanese retired ice hockey player and former member of the Japanese national ice hockey team. She represented Japan at the women's ice hockey tournament at the 1998 Winter Olympics. She also played three seasons with Laval Le Mistral a women's ice hockey team in the National Women's Hockey League. She was second in team scoring during the 1999–2000 NWHL season. Her sister Rie played only one season with Laval Le Mistral (1999–2000).

Career statistics
Japan National Team

Laval Le Mistral (NWHL)

References

External links
 
 
 

1973 births
Living people
Japanese women's ice hockey forwards
Olympic ice hockey players of Japan
Ice hockey players at the 1998 Winter Olympics
People from Tomakomai, Hokkaido
Asian Games silver medalists for Japan
Medalists at the 1999 Asian Winter Games
Medalists at the 2003 Asian Winter Games
Ice hockey players at the 1999 Asian Winter Games
Ice hockey players at the 2003 Asian Winter Games
Asian Games medalists in ice hockey